Le Vent du Nord (The North Wind) is a Canadian folk music group from Saint-Antoine-sur-Richelieu in Quebec. The band performs traditional Québécois music (which is heavily influenced by Celtic music from both Ireland and Brittany), as well as original numbers in this style, in French. In 2018 the group's membership consists of Simon Beaudry (vocals, guitar, Irish bouzouki), Nicolas Boulerice (vocals, hurdy-gurdy, piano accordion, piano), André Brunet (vocals, fiddle, foot-tapping), Réjean Brunet (vocals, diatonic button accordion, acoustic bass guitar, piano and jaw harp) and Olivier Demers (vocals, fiddle, foot-tapping and guitar). Their first eight recordings have been nominated for multiple awards.

History
Le Vent du Nord was formed in 2002. Nicolas Boulerice and  founded the band with Sébastien Dufour and Frédéric Samson.  This configuration lasted only a short time, changing once they met Benoit Bourque (vocals, diatonic button accordion, mandolin, bones, and step dancing) in Vancouver later the same year. With the same interest and passion in folk music, and in spite of the fact that all were engaged in other musical groups at that time, they decided to continue together. Bernard Simard also joined the group on guitar and vocals in the same period. The band officially started in September 2002, and their first album, Maudite Moisson, was released through Borealis Recordings in 2003. The album won a Juno Award for Roots and Tradition Group Album of the Year.

In 2004, Simard was replaced by Simon Beaudry. Bourque was replaced by Réjean Brunet in April 2007. The band performed at the Mémoire et Racines festival in Joliette in July 2008, and later released a recording of this performance, Mesdames et Messieurs. Their 2009 album La part du feu was included in the Top Ten Folk Albums of 2009 by The Boston Globe, and the Top Ten International Albums of 2009 by the Los Angeles Times.

In 2010 the group release an album, Symphonique, and was named Ensemble of the Year at the Canadian Folk Music Awards. Their album La part du feu won a  2011 Juno Award. Another album, Tromper le Temps, was released in 2012.

Le Vent du Nord released their eighth album, Tetu, in 2015, and the following year band performed in London, England.

In late 2017, the fifth member of the band André Brunet joined the group.

Le Vent du Nord then released their ninth album, "Territoires" at Théâtre Fairmont in Montreal on February 12, 2019.

Recordings
2003 Maudite Moisson! - Borealis records
2005 Les amants du Saint-Laurent - Borealis records
2007 Dans les airs - Borealis records
2008 Mesdames et Messieurs - Borealis records
2009 La part du feu - Borealis records
2010 Symphonique - Radio-Canada disque
2012 Tromper le Temps - Borealis records
2015 Têtu - Borealis records
2018 Notre album solo - La Compagnie du Nord w. Le Vent du Nord & De Temps Antan;
2019 Territoires - Borealis records.
2022 20 Printemps - IDLA.

One of their tracks also appears on Putumayo World Music's 2008 Québec collection.

Awards
2022 nominated for Canadian Folk Music Awards "Vocal Group of the Year" and "Traditional Album of the Year" for "20 printemps"
2018 winner of an Opus award Opus Awards "Traditional show of the Year" for Solo w. Le Vent du Nord & De temps antan
2015 winner of a Félix award ADISQ "Traditional Album of the Year" for Têtu
2012 nominated for Canadian Folk Music Awards "Traditional Band of the Year" 
2012 nominated for Canadian Folk Music Awards "Traditional Album of the Year" for Tromper le temps
2012 nominated for ADIS "Traditional Album of the Year" for Tromper le temps
2012 winner of a Grand Prix Musique du Monde pour Tromper le Temps at the 65e annual Académie Charles-Cros awards in Paris 
2012 introduce in the Order of the Porcupine Hall of Fame of the Toronto radio show "Back to the sugar camp"!
2010 winner of Canadian Folk Music Awards "Ensemble of the Year" for La Part du Feu
2011 winner of Juno Award "Roots & Traditional Album of the Year: Group" for La part du feu
2011 winner of Micro d'art 103,5 at the Gala Excelsior Grand Joliette
2010 nominated for ADISQ "Traditional Album of the Year" for La part du feu
2008 nominated for Canadian Folk Music Awards "Traditional Band of the Year" 
2009 nominated for ADISQ "Traditional Album of the Year" for Mesdames et messieurs!
2008 nominated for ADISQ "Traditional Album of the Year" for Dans les airs
2008 nominated for Canadian Folk Music Awards "Traditional Album of the Year" for Dans les airs
2006 winner of North American Folk Music & Dance Association "Best Traditional Artist"
2005 winner of Canadian Folk Music Awards "Best Traditional Album" for Les amants du Saint-Laurent
2005 nominated for ADISQ "Traditional Album of the Year" for Les amants du Saint-Laurent
2004 winner of Juno Award "Roots & Traditional Album of the Year: Group" for Maudite Moisson!
2004 nominated for ADISQ "Traditional Album of the Year" for Maudite Moisson

See also
 Juno Award for Roots & Traditional Album of the Year – Group

References

External links

Le Vent du Nord Official website
Le Vent du Nord on Facebook
Le Vent du Nord on MySpace
Canadian Folk Music Awards
North American Folk Music & Dance Association

Musical groups established in 2002
Musical groups from Quebec
Canadian folk music groups
Canadian Celtic music groups
Juno Award for Roots & Traditional Album of the Year – Group winners
2002 establishments in Quebec
Canadian Folk Music Award winners
Félix Award winners